The 1997–98 Scottish Inter-District Championship was a rugby union competition for Scotland's professional district teams. For 1997-98 season the Scottish Inter-District Championship was sponsored by Inter-City Trains. Hence the Championship became known as the Inter-City and the Cup won became the Inter-City Cup.

1997-98 League Table

Results

Round 1

Round 2

Round 3

Matches outwith the Championship

Trial matches

Blues: 

Reds:

References

1997–98 in Scottish rugby union
1997–98
Scot

External Links
 Rugby Archive